Herald Young Leader is a Hindi language newspaper published in Surat, India. It has established itself over 20 years as the most widely circulated newspaper in the Indian state of Gujarat.  With circulation figures of 4,028,59 copies daily Herald Young Leader is among the top seven circulated Hindi Newspapers in the country. Herald Young Leader offers to the people in the region the latest news, analytical articles, film news and views, sports, commercial views.

With a daily readership of over 20 lakhs**, Herald Young Leader is backed by an audience whose demographic profile is varied in its readership.

References

Daily newspapers published in India
Publications with year of establishment missing
Mass media in Surat